Dorunak (also Romanized as Dorūnak, Darūnak, and Derūnak; also known as Darinak and Qal‘eh-ye Dorūnak) is a village in Famur Rural District, Jereh and Baladeh District, Kazerun County, Fars Province, Iran. At the 2006 census, its population was 359, in 69 families.

References 

Populated places in Kazerun County